Reflection: Axiom of the Two Wings is a compilation album by Japanese singer/songwriter Mari Hamada, released on July 23, 2008 by Meldac/Tokuma Japan to commemorate the 25th anniversary of her music career. The album consists of two discs dubbed "Wings". Wing I features the new songs "Fantasia", "Revolution in Reverse", "Spiral Galaxy", and "Eagle -Hard Rock Mix-", along with a collection of Hamada's heaviest songs. Wing II features a cappella versions of select songs.

The album peaked at No. 58 on Oricon's albums chart.

Track listing

Personnel 
 Michael Landau – guitar
 Tak Matsumoto – guitar
 Takashi Masuzaki – guitar
 Hiroyuki Ohtsuki – guitar
 Kenji Kitajima – guitar
 Takayuki Hijikata – guitar
 Matt Bissonette – bass
 John Pierce – bass
 Kōichi Terasawa – bass
 Yoshihiro Naruse – bass
 Naoki Watanabe – bass
 Masahiko Rokukawa – bass
 Hiro Nagasawa – bass
 Tom Keane – keyboards
 Randy Kerber – keyboards
 Takanobu Masuda – keyboards
 Yōgo Kōno – keyboards
 Yoshinobu Kojima – keyboards
 Yūki Nakajima – keyboards
 Jeff Babko – piano
 Greg Bissonette – drums
 John Keane – drums
 Roger Kazuhisa Takahashi – drums
 Munetaka Higuchi – drums
 Atsuo Okamoto – drums
 Tohru Hasebe – drums
 Jason Scheff – backing vocals

Charts

References

External links 
  (Mari Hamada)
 Official website (Tokuma Japan)
 

2008 compilation albums
Japanese-language compilation albums
Mari Hamada compilation albums
Tokuma Shoten albums